Lee Keun-ho (born 21 May 1996) is a South Korean football forward who plays for Jeonbuk Hyundai Motors in K League 1.

References

External links 
 
 

1996 births
Living people
Association football forwards
South Korean footballers
Pohang Steelers players
Jeonbuk Hyundai Motors players
Jeju United FC players
Gimcheon Sangmu FC players
K League 1 players